Scuola "Enrico Mattei" is a private Italian international school in Morocco which is headquartered in Casablanca. The main campus in Casablanca includes preschool, primary school, lower secondary school, and upper secondary school. There is also a branch school in Tangier.

History
The school opened in 1920. In 1995 the Casablanca campus had 50 students. By 2010 the student count grew to 340, with 85% of the students being Moroccans. A branch campus in Tangier was scheduled to open in September of that year.

References

External links

 "Succursale de l'Ecole paritaire italienne "Enrico Mattei" à Tanger." Les Coulisses de Tanger.

Italian international schools in Africa
International schools in Casablanca
Schools in Tangier
International schools in Morocco
Educational institutions established in 1920
1920 establishments in Morocco
20th-century architecture in Morocco